Iron cap may refer to:
 Gossan - geological formation
 Iron Dome - missile defense system
 Iron-cap princes (铁帽子王) noble rank of the Aisin Gioro, founders of the Qing dynasty